The Law (and originally released in America as Where the Hot Wind Blows) is a 1959 French-Italian film directed by Jules Dassin.

Plot
Beautiful Marietta (Gina Lollobrigida) is a small-town girl who lives in southern Italian fishing village of Porto Manacore, a corrupt village ruled by a petty crook Matteo Brigante (Yves Montand). An engineer, Enrico Tosso (Marcello Mastroianni) comes into town to drain the marshes, and helps the villagers to take back their town.

Cast
 Gina Lollobrigida - Marietta
 Pierre Brasseur - Don Cesare
 Marcello Mastroianni - Enrico Tosso, the Engineer
 Melina Mercouri - Donna Lucrezia
 Yves Montand - Matteo Brigante
 Raf Mattioli - Francesco Brigante
 Vittorio Caprioli - Attilio, the Inspector
 Lidia Alfonsi - Giuseppina
 Gianrico Tedeschi - First Loafer
 Nino Vingelli - Pizzaccio
 Bruno Carotenuto - Balbo
 Luisa Rivelli - Elvira
 Anna Maria Bottini - Maria
 Anna Arena - Anna, Attilio's wife
 Edda Soligo - Giulia
 Joe Dassin - Nico

Production 
The shooting took place in particular in the Gargano: precisely in Carpino, while some scenes were shot in Rodi Garganico, Ischitella, Peschici and San Menaio. The locality "Baia di Manacore" really exists a short distance from Peschici. It is one of the first films shot on the Gargano promontory. If in the novel and in the French version the story is set in the Gargano, in the Italian version the setting of the story is moved to Corsica.

Box office
According to MGM records the film earned $750,000 in the US and Canada and $325,000 elsewhere, resulting in a net loss to the studio of $39,000.

References

External links
 
 
 
 

1959 films
1959 drama films
French drama films
Italian drama films
English-language French films
English-language Italian films
1950s French-language films
1950s Italian-language films
French black-and-white films
Italian black-and-white films
Films directed by Jules Dassin
Films shot in Corsica
Films set in Italy
Metro-Goldwyn-Mayer films
1950s Italian films
1950s French films